(Fårö Gutnish) is the dialect of Gutnish spoken on the Baltic island of Fårö. The name "Fårö" (in Gutnish, Faroy) is derived from the words , meaning island, and probably , which is a word stem associated with travel, as in the Swedish verb  (to travel). The name Fårö probably means 'the island you have to travel to' or 'the traveler's island'. That word is absent from Modern Gutnish, which uses the word  (which in Swedish means 'lamb') instead. Gotlanders describe Faroymal as sounding "coarse" and as characterized by "mumbling".

Fårömål is the most archaic dialect of Gutamal in terms of morphology and phonetics. The dialect is closest to Old Gutnish and has retained, for example, the a-ending of the infinitive. There are also verb endings that no longer exist in the dialect of the main island (Storlandsmål) as in Swedish and Danish (e. g.: ja kimbur, däu kumbort, han kumbur). And while the unstressed endings are often dropped in the Main Island dialect, the Fårö Gutnish has preserved them (e. g. Han skudd' gleid' (gläid') ti Fol u kaup' skog on the main island → Han skudde gläida till Fola u kaupa skog in Farømål).

Notes

References

Bibliography 
 Gunilla Brogren: Um Fåre u Fåreboar pa fåröiskå, Fårö hembygdsförening (Udg.) 2013 ISBN 9789198054712
 Herbert Gustavson: Gutamålet – inledning till studium. 3. oplag. Barry Press Förlag, Visby 1977.
 Adolf Noreen: Fårömålets ljudlära, Stockholm 1875

External links

 Gotlands Museum: Hör du skillnad mellan storlandsgutamål och fårömål?
 Sveriges Radio P4 Gotland: Fåröborna vill rädda sitt språk

 
Gotland
North Germanic languages
Endangered Germanic languages
Languages of Sweden
Scandinavian culture
Germanic languages